Magnolia Hall may refer to the following buildings in the United States:

Magnolia Hall (Greensboro, Alabama)
Magnolia Hall (Natchez, Mississippi)
Magnolia Hall (Hagood, South Carolina)
William S. Campbell House, also known as Magnolia Hall, in Franklin, Tennessee

See also
Magnolia Hotel (disambiguation)

Architectural disambiguation pages